"Gi' Me Wings" is a song by British singer Rod Stewart, which was released in 1981 as the fifth and final single from his tenth studio album Foolish Behaviour (1980). The song was written by Stewart and Steve Harley (lyrics), and Phil Chen, Kevin Savigar, Jim Cregan and Gary Grainger (music). It was produced by Stewart (credited as Harry the Hook), with co-production by the Rod Stewart Group and Jeremy Andrew Johns. "Gi' Me Wings" was released as a single in Japan only, but also reached number 45 on the US Billboard Top Rock Tracks chart.

Background
Stewart co-wrote the lyrics to "Gi' Me Wings" with Steve Harley, although Harley did not receive a writing credit when it appeared on Foolish Behaviour. The pair also collaborated on the lyrics for another track that appeared on the album, "Somebody Special", as well as a third song that was not released. Harley recalled to Smiler in 1997,

Critical reception
In a review of Foolish Behaviour, Debra Rae Cohen of Rolling Stone described "Gi' Me Wings" as "pounding" and added that "Valerie Carter's soaring backup vocals add more urgency than either the flamboyant brass arrangements or the self-pitying lyrics". Laura Fissinger of Trouser Press stated, "Stewart can still sing, of course, and delivers 'Gi' Me Wings' with the ease of a child skipping stones across a pond."

Randall Edwards of The Daily Utah Chronicle commented that "rock numbers" such as "Gi' Me Wings" "are tributes to a band that sounds like it's been playing together well for quite some time, anticipating every note, emphasizing every nuance." In a 2019 retrospective, Rhino Insider noted the song "has a burbling undercurrent that gives the track a pulse to go along with the studio sheen of the rest of the instrumentation".

Track listing
7-inch single (Japan)
"Gi' Me Wings" - 3:43
"Somebody Special" - 4:27

Personnel
Credits are adapted from the Foolish Behaviour LP sleeve notes.

Gi' Me Wings
 Rod Stewart – vocals
 Gary Grainger, Jim Cregan – guitars
 Kevin Savigar – keyboards
 Tim Bogert – bass
 Carmine Appice – drums, timpani 
 Jim Price – trombone
 Earl Price – tenor saxophone
 James Gordon – baritone saxophone
 Lee Thornburg – trumpet

Production
 Harry the Hook (Rod Stewart) – producer
 The Rod Stewart Group  – co-producers
 Jeremy Andrew Johns – co-producer, mixing
 Jim Cregan – mixing
 Rick Charles Delana – second engineer

Charts

References

1980 songs
1981 singles
Rod Stewart songs
Songs written by Rod Stewart
Songs written by Steve Harley
Songs written by Kevin Savigar
Songs written by Jim Cregan
Songs written by Gary Grainger
Warner Records singles